The Éditions de l'Atelier is a French publishing house. It was founded as Éditions Ouvrières in 1939. It was the brainchild of a library opened by the Young Christian Workers for the working class in Paris ten years earlier, in 1929, which started publishing books in 1930. The publishing house changed its name in 1993. It is headquartered in Ivry-sur-Seine.

References

External links
Official website

Book publishing companies of France
French companies established in 1939
Le Maitron